Chaelynn Kitz (born March 10, 1997) is a Canadian curler from Oxbow, Saskatchewan. She currently plays second on Team Sherry Anderson.

Career
Kitz represented Saskatchewan at back to back Canadian Mixed Doubles Curling Championships with her boyfriend Brayden Stewart in 2018 and 2019. In 2018, the pair finished first place in their pool with a 5–2 record before losing in the quarterfinals to Chelsea Carey and Colin Hodgson. At their second appearance in 2019, they just missed the playoffs with a 4–3 record.

Kitz joined the Sherry Anderson rink for the 2019–20 season. The team had three semifinal finishes and two quarterfinal finishes on the World Curling Tour. At the 2020 Saskatchewan Scotties Tournament of Hearts, they lost in the final to Robyn Silvernagle 8–5. Due to the COVID-19 pandemic in Saskatchewan, the 2021 Saskatchewan Scotties Tournament of Hearts was cancelled. Since the reigning champions, Team Silvernagle, did not retain three out of four team members still playing together, Team Anderson was invited to represent Saskatchewan at the 2021 Scotties Tournament of Hearts, as they had the most points from the 2019–20 and 2020–21 seasons combined, which they accepted. At the Hearts, they finished with a 6–6 sixth place finish.

Personal life
Kitz is a kinesiology graduate from the University of Saskatchewan. She is in a relationship with fellow curler Brayden Stewart. Her father, Shane Kitz, coaches her team.

Teams

References

External links

1997 births
Canadian women curlers
Living people
Curlers from Saskatchewan
University of Saskatchewan alumni
People from Oxbow, Saskatchewan
Sportspeople from Yorkton